Aircraft earth station (also: aircraft earth radio station) is – according to Article 1.84 of the International Telecommunication Union's (ITU) ITU Radio Regulations (RR) – defined as «A mobile earth station in the aeronautical mobile-satellite service located on board an aircraft.»

Each station shall be classified by the service in which it operates permanently or temporarily.
See also

Classification
In accordance with ITU Radio Regulations (article 1) this type of radio station might be classified as follows: 
Earth station (article 1.63)
Mobile earth station (article 1.68) of the mobile-satellite service (article 1.25)
Land earth station (article 1.70) of the fixed-satellite service (article 1.21) or mobile-satellite service
Land mobile earth station (article 1.74) of the land mobile-satellite service (article 1.27)
Base earth station (article 1.72) of the fixed-satellite service
Coast earth station (article 1.76) of the fixed-satellite service / mobile-satellite service
Ship earth station (article 1.78) of the mobile-satellite service
Aeronautical earth station (article 1.82) of the fixed-satellite service / aeronautical mobile-satellite service (article 1.35)
Aircraft earth station

References / sources 

 International Telecommunication Union (ITU)

Radio stations and systems ITU
Air traffic control